is a district located in central Kanagawa Prefecture, Japan. It currently consists of two towns, Ōiso, and Ninomiya. The majority of the area of the city of Hadano and the entire cities of Hiratsuka and Isehara were formerly part of Naka District.

As of 2009, the district had an estimated population of 62,522 and a density of 2,380 persons per km2. The total area was 26.26 km2.

Towns and villages 
Ninomiya
Ōiso

History

Naka District was one of the four subdivisions of Sagami Province established by the later Hōjō clan of Odawara during the Sengoku period. In the Edo period, it was nominally part of Odawara Domain, although large portions were tenryō territory controlled by the shōgun in Edo through various hatamoto.

Timeline
On March 26, 1896, these two districts were joined to form the modern Naka District, which initially consisted of five towns and 23 villages. Hiratsuka was elevated to city status in 1932, followed by Hadano in 1955 and Isehara in 1971.

Merger table

Districts in Kanagawa Prefecture